The National Science Centre established in 1992, is a science museum in Delhi, India. It is part of the National Council of Science Museums (NCSM), an autonomous body under India's Ministry of Culture. It stands close to Gate no 1, of Pragati Maidan overlooking the Purana Qila.

History
The National Science Centre is the northern zonal headquarters of the National Council of Science Museums. The coming to power of Rajiv Gandhi saw a fresh impetus for science popularisation. With Kolkata, Bangalore and Mumbai already operating Science Centres, a need for a big Centre in the Nation's capital in Delhi in the north was felt, and work started in earnest in 1984. It was inaugurated on 9 January 1992 by the then Prime Minister of India, P.V.Narasimha Rao and is situated between the Gate Nos. 1 and 2 of the  Pragati Maidan exhibition grounds, on the Bhairon Road, across Purana Qila, Delhi. The building was designed by noted Indian architect Achyut Kanvinde.

Galleries
The museum contains seven permanent galleries. From the top floor, these are, in order: Our Science and Technology Heritage, opened in October 2009; Human Biology; the History of the Earth; Fun Science, containing a penny-farthing bicycle gifted by Rajiv Gandhi and a number of other interactive exhibits; Information Revolution; Emerging Technologies; and Water, Elixir of Life, which was opened in December 2010.

See also
 Swami Vivekananda Planetarium, Mangalore
 Van Vigyan Kendra (VVK) Forest Science Centres

References

Museums in Delhi
Museums established in 1992
Science museums in India
1992 establishments in Delhi